Abd al-Sattar Tawfiq Qasim al-Khader (21 September 1948 – 1 February 2021) was a Palestinian writer, thinker, political analyst, and academic. He was born in the town of Deir al-Ghusun in Tulkarm Governorate and died in Nablus. Qasim was a professor of political science and Palestinian studies at An-Najah National University in Nablus. He is known for his positions rejecting the settlement with Israel and critical of the Palestinian Self-Government Authority.

Life
He received a bachelor's degree in political science from The American University in Cairo, then a master's degree in political science from the American Kansas State University, then a master's degree in economics from the University of Missouri, USA, then a doctorate in political philosophy from the University of Missouri also in 1977.

Qasim worked at the University of Jordan with the rank of assistant professor in 1978 and his services were terminated after a year and a half in 1979. He worked as a professor of political science at An-Najah National University in Nablus since 1980, and he worked as a part-time professor at each university, Birzeit University and Al-Quds University. He retired from teaching from An-Najah National University in 2013.

Awards
In 1984, he won the Abdul Hameed Shoman Prize in the field of political science.

Writings

Books and research
He has published 25 books, and has written about 130 scientific papers and thousands of articles. Of which:
 Traditional political philosophy
 Fall of the King of Kings (On the Iranian Revolution)
 The martyr Ezz El-Din Al-Qassam
 The Golan Heights
 The detention experiment
 Days in the Naqab detention camp
 Individual and group freedom in Islam
 Women in Islamic Thought
 Prophet Abraham and the covenant with the children of Israel
 The road to defeat
 The summary on the Palestinian issue.
 The graves of Arab intellectuals

He has written many research papers on various topics in politics, such as the Americanization of the Arabs, the Palestinian resistance, Islamic political thought and globalization.

Death
He died on 1 February 2021, at An-Najah National University Hospital in Nablus, after being infected with COVID-19 during the COVID-19 pandemic in the State of Palestine.

References

1948 births
2021 deaths
People from Deir al-Ghusun
Academic staff of An-Najah National University
Academic staff of Birzeit University
Palestinian politicians
Palestinian writers
Palestinian political scientists
The American University in Cairo alumni
Kansas State University alumni
University of Missouri alumni
Deaths from the COVID-19 pandemic in the State of Palestine